Ibrahim Fazeel (born 9 October 1980) is a Maldivian footballer nicknamed "Oppo", who can play both as a midfielder and as a forward currently who plays for Llangefni Town FC
He started his career while he was a student in Majeedhiyaa School in 1999. Fazeel played his first international match on 2 April 2000 against Syria (AFC Asian Cup Lebanon 2000) and scored first goal in the Golden jubilee international tournament against Bangladesh. He is the only player who scored for times in the semi-finals to take Maldives to the finals.

After his international duty in 1999, he signed for his first club New lagoons in 2000. Between 2001 and 2003 he played for IFC which was the best club at that time. From 2004 to 2006 he changed to New Radiant SC. In 2007, a new club named VB signed him for a record fee. In October 2007, he transferred to DPMM FC in Brunei along with fellow Maldivian Ali Ashfaq and scored two goals for the team. In 2008, Fazeel lend his team to travel to final in SAFF Championship 2008 by scoring a goal against Sri Lanka. From 2008 to 2011 he played for Victory SC. Later in 2012, he played for New Radiant SC along with his National teammates Ashfaq and Ahmed Thoriq and played for BG Sports in 2013 and returned to his old team New Radiant SC He was one of the most important members of the Maldives national football team.

At the 2014 AFC Challenge Cup, Fazeel helped the Maldives National Football Team by scoring a penalty kick which led the team to 3rd place against Afghanistan by 1–1 (8–7)

Club career
Anglesey League club Bodorgan FC acquired the signature of Fazeel on 7 February 2016.

On 20 January 2017, Welsh Alliance side Llangefni Town F.C. completed the signing of Fazeel.

Honours

Maldives
 SAFF Championship: 2008

References

1980 births
Living people
Expatriate footballers in Brunei
Maldivian footballers
Maldives international footballers
Maldivian expatriate footballers
Maldivian expatriate sportspeople in Brunei
New Radiant S.C. players
Victory Sports Club players
People from Malé
DPMM FC players
Association football forwards
Footballers at the 2002 Asian Games
Footballers at the 2006 Asian Games
Footballers at the 2010 Asian Games
Asian Games competitors for the Maldives
Llangefni Town F.C. players